Mangalamkali is a dance ritual related to marriage functions as a form of entertainment. Usually mavilas (a tribe in kasaragod and kannur districts Kerala (state of south India) perform this. Certain music instruments too are used like thudi. The dance movement gradually become fast.

See also
 Arts of Kerala
 Kerala Folklore Academy

References

Dances of Kerala